Młynisko  is a village in the administrative district of Gmina Koźminek, within Kalisz County, Greater Poland Voivodeship, in west-central Poland.

The village has a population of 190.

See also
Młynisko, Łódź Voivodeship (central Poland)
Młynisko, Masovian Voivodeship (east-central Poland)
Młynisko, Pomeranian Voivodeship (north Poland)

References

Villages in Kalisz County